A grand design spiral galaxy is a type of spiral galaxy with prominent and well-defined spiral arms, as opposed to multi-arm and flocculent spirals which have subtler structural features. The spiral arms of a grand design galaxy extend clearly around the galaxy through many radians and can be observed over a large fraction of the galaxy's radius. As of 2002, approximately 10 percent of all currently known spiral galaxies are classified as grand design type spirals, including M51, M74, M81, M83, and M101.

Origin of structure 
Density wave theory is the preferred explanation for the well-defined structure of grand design spirals,  first suggested by Lin and Shu in 1964. The term "grand design" was not used in this work, but appeared in the 1966 continuation paper, Lin (along with Yuan and Shu) is usually credited with coining of the term. 

According to the density wave theory, the spiral arms are created inside density waves that turn around the galaxy at different speeds from the stars in the galaxy's disk. Stars and gas are clumped in these dense regions due to gravitational attraction towards the dense material, though their location in the spiral arm may not be permanent. When they come close to the spiral arm, they are pulled toward the dense material by the force of gravity; and as they travel through the arm, they are slowed from exiting by the same gravitational pull. This causes the gas in particular to clump in the dense regions, which encourages gas clouds to collapse, producing star formation.

References 

Galaxy morphological types